Kamyennaya Horka (lit:"Stone Hill") is a Minsk Metro station. Opened on 7 November 2005.

History 
Construction of the station began on 5 June 2011. Originally planned for opening in September 2005, it was postponed to 7 November 2005 as part of the opening of the fifth section of the line.

Gallery

References 

Minsk Metro stations
Railway stations opened in 2005